was a  after Eikan and before Eien. This period spanned the years from April 985 through April 987.

Change of era
 January 24, 985 : The new era name was created to mark an event or a number of events. The previous era ended and a new one commenced in Eikan 3, on the 27th day of the 4th month of 985.

Events of the Kanna era
 986 (Kanna 2, 6th month): Kazan abdicated, and took up residence at Kazan-ji where he became a Buddhist monk; and his new priestly name was Nyūkaku.
 August 23, 986 (Kanna 2, 16th day of the 7th month): Iyasada-shinnō was appointed as heir and crown prince at age 11. This followed the convention that two imperial lineages took the throne in turn, although Emperor Ichijō was in fact Iyasada's junior. He thus gained the nickname Sakasa-no moke-no kimi (the imperial heir in reverse). When Emperor Kanzan abandoned the world for holy orders, this grandson of Kaneie ascended to the throne as Emperor Ichijō.

Notes

References
 Brown, Delmer M. and Ichirō Ishida, eds. (1979).  Gukanshō: The Future and the Past. Berkeley: University of California Press. ;  OCLC 251325323
 Nussbaum, Louis-Frédéric and Käthe Roth. (2005).  Japan encyclopedia. Cambridge: Harvard University Press. ;  OCLC 58053128
 Titsingh, Isaac. (1834). Nihon Ōdai Ichiran; ou,  Annales des empereurs du Japon.  Paris: Royal Asiatic Society, Oriental Translation Fund of Great Britain and Ireland. OCLC 5850691
 Varley, H. Paul. (1980). A Chronicle of Gods and Sovereigns: Jinnō Shōtōki of Kitabatake Chikafusa. New York: Columbia University Press. ;  OCLC 6042764

External links
 National Diet Library, "The Japanese Calendar" -- historical overview plus illustrative images from library's collection

Japanese eras
10th century in Japan